Dead Indian Creek may refer to:

Dead Indian Creek (Oklahoma)
Dead Indian Creek (Oregon)
Dead Indian Creek (Wyoming)

See also
Dead Injun Creek